Clas Jonas Theodor Odhner (17 June 1836 in Alingsås, Sweden – 11 June 1904 in Stockholm, Sweden) was a Swedish historian, and director of the Swedish National Archives (Riksarkivet).

The son of a clergyman, Odhner's mother was a sister of Nils Ericson and John Ericsson. Odhner went to school in Skara and matriculated at Uppsala University in 1851, completing the degree of filosofie magister and becoming a docent of History in 1860. He taught at Lund University from 1865, as professor of history from 1870 until 1887, when he was appointed riksarkivarie, director of the National Archives, a position where he remained until 1901. Odhner was a member of the Second Chamber of the Riksdag 1894–1897. He was elected Member of the Swedish Academy in 1885, and was member of several other learned societies.

Odhner was a productive writer, and the schoolbooks he authored were influential. He was the main mover in the introduction of the new organisation of the archives for government agencies with a number of provincial archives (landsarkiv), to some extent subordinate to the National Archives.

He was father of the zoologist and explorer Teodor Odhner. The engineer Willgodt Odhner was the son of his first cousin.

References
Herman Schück, "Odhner, Clas Jonas Theodor", Svenskt biografiskt lexikon, vol. 28.

1836 births
1904 deaths
Members of the Swedish Academy
Swedish archivists
19th-century Swedish historians
Uppsala University alumni
Academic staff of Lund University
Burials at Norra begravningsplatsen